Pannaivayal is a village in the Pattukkottai taluk of Thanjavur district, Tamil Nadu, India.

Demographics 

As per the 2001 census, Pannaivayal had a total population of 1604 with 812 males and 792 females. The sex ratio was 975. The literacy rate was 70.31.

References 

 

Villages in Thanjavur district